APTF may be:

 Advanced Placement Test Fee
 American Public Transportation Foundation or American Public Transit Foundation
 Assam Police Task Force